Ali Akbar Rupu (died 22 February 2018) was a Bangladeshi music composer and music director. He composed songs for Bangladeshi television magazines programme Ityadi and films including Rastar Chhele and Dui Biyai-er Kirti.

Career
Rupu started his career by working on 'An Accident' album in 1980. In 1982, he played guitar and keyboard in the band 'Uccharon'. He composed songs for most of the notable singers in Bangladesh. Notable songs he composed include Kumar Bishwajit's "Ekdin Kannar rol uthbe amar barite", "Jare ghor dila songsar dila", "Jassu jemon mukhush pore probesh kore ghore", "dardiya", "e onchoyata", "Ek pashla bristi', Andrew Kishore's "Padma patar pani noy", Sabina Yasmin, Kanak Chapa and Samina Chowdhury's "Sob chaoya kache paoya" and Niaz Mohammad Chowdhury's "Kobitar moto meyeti, golper moto cheleti" etc.

Personal life
Rupu was married to Nargis Akbar. They had a son, Ali Afzal Sidney and a daughter, Fariha Naz Apon. Rupu's father Ustad Mansur Ali was also a  composer and violinist. His paternal uncle Dhir Ali Miah was a Ekushey Padak winning composer.  Musician Alauddin Ali was his maternal uncle.

References

1960s births
2018 deaths
People from Munshiganj District
Bangladeshi composers
Bangladeshi male musicians
Bangladeshi music directors